The eighth general election of the 45-seat Regional Council of the South Caribbean Coast, one of the two autonomous regions of Nicaragua, took place on 3 March 2019.

Results

References

Elections in Nicaragua
2019 elections in Central America
South Caribbean Coast Autonomous Region
2019 in Nicaragua
Autonomous regions of Nicaragua